Dudley Central Mosque and Muslim Community Centre is a mosque and community centre in Dudley, England. It was established to advance the religion of Islam for the benefit of public by holding of the Congregational Prayers and religious lectures according to the Sunni Sect of Islam (Ahle Sunnat Wal Jammat, Barelvi School of thought).

Expansion Plan
In 2003, plans were unveiled for the construction of a new mosque (which become known as the "Super Mosque" locally) in Hall Street, a site that had been leased by Dudley Council to the Dudley Muslim Association, in exchange for a site impacted by a proposed bypass. The mosque proposals were scrapped in May 2010, after a long dispute, in favour of an expansion to the existing Dudley Central Mosque in Castle Hill, an appeal was made by the Dudley Muslim Association against the High Court ruling, and failed in February 2014.

Activities
Open day was declared in 2015 to invited residents of all faiths to join them on 28 February 2015, to take a tour of Mosque and were invited to ask questions about Islam and find out more about plans for the proposed new mosque.

See also
List of mosques in the United Kingdom
Islam in England

References

External links
 Dudley Central Mosque

Mosques in England
Barelvi mosques